Rostamabad may refer to the following places in Iran:

Ardabil Province
Rostamabad, Ardabil, a village in Kowsar County

Chaharmahal and Bakhtiari Province
Rostamabad, Chaharmahal and Bakhtiari, a village in Ardal County

Fars Province
Rostamabad, Fars, a village in Kazerun County

Gilan Province
Rostamabad, Gilan, a city in Gilan Province, Iran
Rostamabad-e Jonubi Rural District
Rostamabad-e Shomali Rural District

Hamadan Province
Rostamabad, Hamadan, a village in Asadabad County

Hormozgan Province
Rostamabad-e Dehvast, a village in Bashagard County
Rostamabad, Parsian, a village in Parsian County
Rostamabad, Rudan, a village in Rudan County

Isfahan Province

Kerman Province
Narmashir, formerly, Rostamabad, a city in Kerman Province, Iran
Rostamabad-e Chah Degan, a village in Fahraj County
Rostamabad, Qaleh Ganj, a village in Qaleh Ganj County
Rostamabad, Rigan, a village in Rigan County
Rostamabad, Rudbar-e Jonubi, a village in Rudbar-e Jonubi County

Kermanshah Province
Rostamabad-e Bozorg, a village in Kangavar County
Rostamabad-e Kuchak, a village in Kangavar County
Rostamabad-e Rika, a village in Kermanshah County

Khuzestan Province
Rostamabad, Andika, a village in Andika County
Rostamabad, Ramhormoz, a village in Ramhormoz County

Lorestan Province
Rostamabad, Lorestan, a village in Lorestan Province, Iran
Rostamabad Jamshidi, a village in Lorestan Province, Iran

North Khorasan Province
Rostamabad, North Khorasan, a village in North Khorasan Province, Iran

Qazvin Province
Rostamabad, Qazvin, a village in Qazvin Province, Iran

Razavi Khorasan Province
Rostamabad, Nishapur, a village in Nishapur County

Semnan Province
Rostamabad, Semnan, a village in Aradan County

Sistan and Baluchestan Province
Rostamabad, Nukabad, a village in Khash County

Tehran Province
Rostamabad, Damavand, a village in Damavand County
Rostamabad, Varamin, a village in Varamin County

Yazd Province

Zanjan Province